Modjtaba Sadria (born March 1949) is an Iranian-born philosopher, socio-cultural theorist and international social policy development specialist. Professor Sadria has particular expertise in cross-cultural relations and East Asian studies. He has published many books and articles, including: "Global Civil Society and Ethics: Finding Common Ground" (Tokyo, 2003), "People Who Live on the Edge of the World" (Tokyo, 2002), "Realism: Trap of International Relations" (1994, in Japanese), and "Prayer for Lost Objects: A Non-Weberian Approach to the Birth of Modern Society" (2003, in Persian).
He has been the head of «Think Tank for Knowledge Excellence» since 2009, in Tehran, Iran. He has been scientific consultant in Denmark Nomad Academy, since summer 2011.

Academic career
Sadria was educated in Germany for International Law, France for Philosophy, History, and Sociology, and Canada for International relations, and Cultural Studies. He has worked for several universities in various countries as a scholar such as the Institute for the Study of Muslism Civilisations, Aga Khan University, Institute of Policy and Cultural Studies, Chuo University, Institute of Oriental Culture, University of Tokyo, and Université de Montréal. Sadria has been Professor of Monash University Faculty of Medicine, Nursing and Health Sciences in Melbourne, Australia since September 2009.

Social activities
Sadria organises several intellectual networks around the globe. Notably, he has been the Master Jury in 2004 and Steering Committee in 2007 and 2010 for Aga Khan Award for Architecture, and Senior Associate of Global Reconciliation Network and Director of the Australian Centre for West and Central Asian Studies. He was also an important intellectual for UN Dialogue Among Civilizations, and a member of Kyoto International Culture Forum. As some other primal projects, Sadria is a founder of Study Group on Human Security, CITIES: Big Small Stories of Changes (In Turkish), and Small and large Stories of Change (In German). Furthermore, his vigorous activities can be seen in various other socio-intellectual movements such as Changing Teheran, and Global Cities Research Institute.

Bibliography

Books and edited collections

References

20th-century Iranian philosophers
Living people
1949 births
21st-century Iranian philosophers